The Wilks Memorial Award is awarded by the American Statistical Association to recognize outstanding contributions to statistics.  It was established in 1964 and is awarded yearly. It is named in memory of the statistician Samuel S. Wilks. The award consists of a medal, a citation and a cash honorarium of US$1500 (as of 2008).

Recipients

1964 Frank E. Grubbs
1965 John W. Tukey
1966 Leslie E. Simon
1967 William G. Cochran
1968 Jerzy Neyman
1969 W. J. Youden
1970 George W. Snedecor
1971 Harold F. Dodge
1972 George E.P. Box
1973 Herman Otto Hartley
1974 Cuthbert Daniel
1975 Herbert Solomon
1976 Solomon Kullback
1977 Churchill Eisenhart
1978 William Kruskal
1979 Alexander M. Mood
1980 W. Allen Wallis
1981 Holbrook Working
1982 Frank Proschan
1983 W. Edwards Deming
1984 Z. W. Birnbaum
1985 Leo A. Goodman
1986 Frederick Mosteller
1987 Herman Chernoff
1988 Theodore W. Anderson
1989 C. R. Rao
1990 Bradley Efron
1991 Ingram Olkin
1992 Wilfrid Dixon
1993 Norman L. Johnson
1994 Emanuel Parzen
1995 Donald Rubin
1996 Erich L. Lehmann
1997 Leslie Kish
1998 David O. Siegmund
1999 Lynne Billard
2000 Stephen Fienberg
2001 George C. Tiao
2002 Lawrence D. Brown
2003 David L. Wallace
2004 Paul Meier
2005 Roderick J. A. Little
2006 Marvin Zelen
2007 Colin L. Mallows
2008 Scott Zeger
2009 Lee-Jen Wei
2010 Pranab K. Sen
2011 Nan Laird
2012 Peter Gavin Hall
2013 Kanti Mardia
2014 Madan L. Puri
2015 James O. Berger
2016 David Donoho
2017 Wayne Fuller
2018 Peter J. Bickel
2019 Alan E. Gelfand
2020 Malay Ghosh
2021 Sallie Ann Keller

References

Statistical awards
American awards
Awards established in 1964
1964 establishments in the United States